Conus augur, common name the auger cone, is a species of sea snail, a marine gastropod mollusk in the family Conidae, the cone snails, cone shells or cones.

Like all species within the genus Conus, these snails are predatory and venomous. They are capable of "stinging" humans, therefore live ones should be handled carefully or not at all.

Description
The size of an adult shell varies between 45 mm and 76 mm. The creamy white shell is encircled by close rows of very small chestnut dots, with two bands of irregular brown markings, one above, the other below the middle of the body whorl. The spire is maculated with brown.

Distribution
This marine species occurs in the Indian Ocean along the Aldabra Atoll and Madagascar; and in the Southwest Pacific Ocean.

References

 Filmer R.M. (2001). A Catalogue of Nomenclature and Taxonomy in the Living Conidae 1758 - 1998. Backhuys Publishers, Leiden. 388pp.
 Tucker J.K. (2009). Recent cone species database. 4 September 2009 Edition
 Tucker J.K. & Tenorio M.J. (2013) Illustrated catalog of the living cone shells. 517 pp. Wellington, Florida: MdM Publishing.
 Puillandre N., Duda T.F., Meyer C., Olivera B.M. & Bouchet P. (2015). One, four or 100 genera? A new classification of the cone snails. Journal of Molluscan Studies. 81: 1–23
 Franklin, J.B,, S. Antony Fernando, B. A. Chalke, K. S. Krishnan. (2007). 'Radular Morphology of Conus (Gastropoda: Caenogastropoda: Conidae) from India'. Molluscan Research. Vol. 27 (3): 111–122.
 Franklin, J.B, K. A. Subramanian, S. A. Fernando and Krishnan K. S. (2009). Diversity and distribution of cone snails (Vallapoo) along the Tamilnadu coast, India, Zootaxa 2250: 1–63 (Monograph).

Gallery

External links
  The Conus  Biodiversity website
 
 Cone Shells – Knights of the Sea

augur
Gastropods described in 1786